John Edward Bromby (23 May 1809 – 4 March 1889) was an Australian schoolmaster and Anglican cleric.

Bromby was born in Hull, England, the son of the Reverend John Healey Bromby and his wife Jane, née Amis. His brother was Charles Henry Bromby, later Bishop of Tasmania.  Bromby was educated at Hull Grammar School and Uppingham. At 18 he entered St John's College, Cambridge, where he graduated ninth wrangler and third in the second class of the Classics tripos in 1832. He was elected a fellow of St John's College.

Bromby was ordained deacon in 1834 and priest in 1836. He was appointed second master at Bristol College in 1836 and then for some years conducted a private school at Clifton. From 1847 to 1854 he was Principal of Elizabeth College, Guernsey, was university preacher at Cambridge in 1850, obtaining the degree of D.D., and after 1854 was curate for two or three years to his father at Hull. He was then appointed headmaster of the newly founded Church of England Grammar School in Melbourne, Australia, where he arrived in February 1858 with his wife and nine children.

The school opened on 7 April 1858 with 86 students and the number of boys soon began to grow rapidly. There were 195 at the school in 1861 and it prospered for many years. He was appointed a member of a Royal Commission to report on the working of the educational system on 4 September 1866. About 1871 the number of students at the Grammar school began to fall off, partly because of the foundation of other secondary schools, and in 1874, feeling that it might be for the benefit of the school to have a younger headmaster, Bromby resigned and was succeeded by Edward Ellis Morris. He was appointed incumbent of St Paul's, Melbourne, in 1877 a position he held until his death. On the completion of his seventy-fifth year in 1884 he was presented with an address and £1,000. He died at his parsonage at East Melbourne and was buried in the Melbourne General Cemetery. He was married twice and was survived by his second wife and two sons and three daughters of the first marriage. He was the author of a volume of Sermons and the Earlier Chapters of Genesis, and several of his lectures and sermons were published as pamphlets.

Bromby as a headmaster encouraged games and relied more on a good moral tone than strict discipline. He was for many years a member of the council of the University of Melbourne, and was its first Warden of the Senate. As a clergyman, though he claimed to belong to no school, he was in sympathy with the broad church section of the Church of England, and was one of the best preachers of his period, scholarly and fearless in his independence of thought, with a pleasant voice and delivery. Though apparently somewhat reserved and austere, he was really thoroughly kindly in his disposition, and was a good conversationalist, with much appreciation of wit and humour.

References

Further reading
 

1809 births
1889 deaths
Australian headmasters
Australian Anglicans
Alumni of St John's College, Cambridge
People from Kingston upon Hull
English emigrants to Australia
19th-century English Anglican priests
Melbourne Grammar School